Wase Rock (Hausa: Gwauron Dutse) is a massive dome shaped rocky inselberg found near Wase town in Wase Local Government Area  of Plateau State in central Nigeria.

History
Wase Rock is a trachyte neck rising  from the floor of the Benue Rift, 160 km SE of Jos. It is all that remains of a once giant volcano. The rock, with its vertical sides, has its summit split into two by a narrow chasm and the base is surrounded by talus slopes (scree)

Appearance 
It has been described as a volcanic plug by geographers. It is visible for a radius of  due to its height. It is one of the only five breeding places for the Rossy white pelican birds in Africa.

References 

Inselbergs of Africa